Amanda Clark or Clarke may refer to:

Amanda Clark, sailor
Emily Thorne, the protagonist of Revenge whose birth name is Amanda Clarke
Amanda Clarke, character in Jane by Design
Mandy Clark, voice actress